Ragan may refer to:

Ragan (surname)
Ragan, Nebraska
Ragan (film), a 1968 spy film
Ragan (Blake), female character in the mythology of William Blake

See also
Rajan
Regan (disambiguation)
Reagan (disambiguation)